CIFM-FM is a Canadian radio station, broadcasting at 98.3 FM in Kamloops, British Columbia. The station currently broadcasts an Active rock format branded as 98.3 CIFM.

The station was launched in 1962 as CFFM-FM by Inland Broadcasters, and was acquired by the Jim Pattison Group in 1987.

Rebroadcasters
The station also has the following rebroadcast transmitters:

External links
98.3 CIFM
CIFM-FM history - Canadian Communications Foundation

Ifm
Ifm
Ifm
Radio stations established in 1962
1962 establishments in British Columbia